The Cyrus International Tournament or simply Cyrus Cup was a friendly football tournament held in Tehran, Iran between June 25 to July 4, 1971. As this tournament was held at the same year of the 2,500 year celebration of Iran's monarchy celebrating the foundation of Persian Empire by Cyrus the Great the name Cyrus was given to the tournament.

This tournament was won by Iran who also managed to qualify from Asia for the 1972 Olympic Games the following year.

Participant teams

The tournament's participants were from three confederations.

Results

Group stage

Group A

Group B

Semi finals

Third Place

Final

Top scorers
 1.  Safar Iranpak

Squads

Argeș Pitești

Austria (Amateur)

Iran

Morocco XI

Netherlands (Amateur)

Turkey U23

Zamalek SC

FC Zbrojovka Brno

References

 https://web.archive.org/web/20101028113938/http://faghir.blog.com/
 http://babakfaghir.blogfa.com/post-3.aspx
 https://web.archive.org/web/20081217045832/http://perspolis-club.net/static.aspx?type=honor&lan=fa
 http://fa.shahrvand.com/2008-07-14-21-07-55/2008-07-14-21-09-22/1580-2008-11-26-16-22-03
 http://www.tebyan.net/Sports/SpecialReports/SpecialReports/2004/7/31/7695.html
 http://arash1-football.blogfa.com/cat-1.aspx
 https://web.archive.org/web/20110722014927/http://www.iriff.ir/dictionary/files/match_information.asp?grp_id=141&grp_pid=254
 https://web.archive.org/web/20110722014941/http://www.iriff.ir/dictionary/files/match_information.asp?grp_id=143&grp_pid=257

1971
1971–72 in Iranian football
1971–72 in Romanian football
1971–72 in Turkish football
1971–72 in Dutch football
1971–72 in Austrian football
1971–72 in Czechoslovak football
1971 in African football